The Million Dollar Hotel: Music from the Motion Picture is the soundtrack to the 2000 film The Million Dollar Hotel. The album was released alongside the film in March 2000, and featured Bono as its executive producer, with new music from U2 and other artists.

Composition
The lyrics of "The Ground Beneath Her Feet" were written by Salman Rushdie, based on his book of the same name. The soundtrack version of the song is a different mix from the one used in the film, which was not released commercially. Along with "Stateless," "The Ground Beneath Her Feet" was recorded for U2's All That You Can't Leave Behind album, but was released on this soundtrack instead. "The Ground Beneath Her Feet" was later released as a bonus track on Australian, British, and Japanese versions of All That You Can't Leave Behind. "Stateless" was later released on the Unreleased & Rare album of U2's digital box set, The Complete U2. "The First Time" originally appeared on U2's 1993 Zooropa album. The version on the soundtrack is identical to the one on the album.

Jon Hassell's "Amsterdam Blue (Cortége)" was originally recorded as a tribute to Chet Baker and submitted to Bono and director Wim Wenders, who made the song a pivotal part of the soundtrack. "Anarchy in the USA" is a Spanish cover of the Sex Pistols' 1976 "Anarchy in the U.K." The film also features the Hal Wilner track "Nyack Oud Dance" which is not on the soundtrack—the song previously appeared on his album Whoops, I'm an Indian.

Reception
Stephen Thomas Erlewine of Allmusic gave the album three out of five stars, noting that, "It's easy to get lost in the slow, dark crawl of the music," but "once the soundtrack loses momentum, it never regains its forward motion." Entertainment Weekly gave it a C, claiming that the non-U2 material was either "admirable but dull... or simply dull." Jeffrey Gantz of The Boston Phoenix gave the album three out of four stars remarking that the strongest tracks are the U2 songs and the rest of the soundtrack provides, "a yearning LA noir atmosphere... but doesn't contribute much on its own."

Track listing

Personnel
U2
Bono – lead vocals, guitar, production (track 4)
Adam Clayton – bass guitar
The Edge – guitar, keyboards, backing vocals, production (7)
Larry Mullen Jr. – drums, percussion

The Million Dollar Hotel Band
Brian Blade – drums, percussion
Greg Cohen – bass guitar
Adam Dorn – beats, synthesizers, programming
Brian Eno – keyboards, production (tracks 1–3, 7)
Bill Frisell – guitar
Jon Hassell – trumpet, production (13)
Daniel Lanois – guitar, vocals, pedal steel, production (1–3, 5, 9, 12)

Additional personnel
Gregg Arreguin
Flood – production (track 7)
Tim Palmer – mixing (1)
Peter Freeman
Milla Jovovich – vocals (15)
Tito Larriva – vocals (16)
Brad Mehldau – piano
Jamie Muhoberac – keyboards
Danny Saber – production (15)
Hal Willner – production (4–6, 8–12, 14, 16)

Certifications

References

External links

Albums produced by Brian Eno
Albums produced by Daniel Lanois
Albums produced by Flood (producer)
Albums produced by Hal Willner
Drama film soundtracks
U2 albums
2000 soundtrack albums
Electronic soundtracks
Jazz soundtracks
Rock soundtracks
Interscope Records soundtracks
Island Records soundtracks
Albums produced by Bono
Albums produced by the Edge